Fabrizi is a surname of Italian origin. Notable people with the name include:

Aldo Fabrizi (1905–90), Italian actor, director, screenwriter and comedian
Elena Fabrizi (1915–93), Italian actress and TV personality
Franco Fabrizi (1916–95), Italian actor
John M. Fabrizi (born 1956), mayor of Bridgeport, Connecticut
Mario Fabrizi (1924–63), British actor
Nicola Fabrizi (1804–85), Italian patriot
Valeria Fabrizi (born 1936), Italian actress
Vincenzo Fabrizi (1764–c. 1812), Italian composer

Italian-language surnames